The 2019 Delray Beach Open was a professional men's tennis tournament played on hard courts. It was the 27th edition of the tournament, and part of the ATP Tour 250 category of the 2019 ATP Tour. It took place in Delray Beach, Florida, United States between February 18 and February 24, 2019. Unseeded Radu Albot won the singles title.

Singles main-draw entrants

Seeds

1 Rankings as of February 11, 2019

Other entrants 
The following players received wildcards into the main draw:
  Juan Martín del Potro
  Lloyd Harris 
  John Isner

The following player received entry as a special exempt:
  Brayden Schnur

The following player received entry as an alternate:
  Jason Jung

The following players received entry from the qualifying draw:
  Dan Evans 
  Darian King 
  Tim Smyczek 
  Yosuke Watanuki

Withdrawals 
Before the tournament
  Kevin Anderson → replaced by  Marcel Granollers
  Bradley Klahn → replaced by  Jason Jung
  Michael Mmoh → replaced by  Lukáš Lacko
  Milos Raonic → replaced by  Jared Donaldson
  Jack Sock → replaced by  Paolo Lorenzi

Doubles main-draw entrants

Seeds 

1 Rankings are as of February 11, 2019.

Other entrants 
The following pairs received wildcards into the main draw:
  Roberto Maytín /  Nathan Pasha
  Ramkumar Ramanathan /  Tim Smyczek

Finals

Singles 

  Radu Albot defeated  Dan Evans 3–6, 6–3, 7–6(9–7)

Doubles 

  Bob Bryan /  Mike Bryan defeated  Ken Skupski /  Neal Skupski, 7–6(7–5), 6–4

References

External links
Official website

Delray Beach Open
Delray Beach Open
Delray Beach Open
Delray Beach
Delray Beach Open